Golpa (also Romanized as Golpā) is a village in Sarchehan Rural District, Sarchehan District, Bavanat County, Fars Province, Iran. At the 2006 census, its population was 69, in 17 families.

References 

Populated places in Sarchehan County